St. Agnes' Church in Burmantofts, Leeds, West Yorkshire, England is an active Anglican parish church in the archdeaconry of Leeds and the Diocese of Leeds.

History
The church was built to designs by architects Kelly and Birchall of Leeds between 1886 and 1887 with later alterations by Lord Grimthorpe.

Architectural style

The church is of a gothic revival style, built of coursed stone with ashlar dressings.  The church has a steeply pitched slate roof with gable ends.  The church has a four-bay nave with octagonal piers.  The reredos is made 1891 of Burmantofts faience and coloured tiles.  The church has a terracotta memorial below west window which commemorates James Holroyd (1839–1890), the founder of the Burmantofts Faience Works, erected 'by his employees'.

See also
List of places of worship in the City of Leeds

References

External links

St. Agnes United Church, Leeds

Churches in Leeds
Listed buildings in Leeds
Anglican Diocese of Leeds
Church of England church buildings in West Yorkshire
Grade II listed churches in West Yorkshire
Gothic Revival architecture in Leeds